Chung Yung-chi (born 8 October 1957) is a Taiwanese weightlifter. He competed at the 1984 Summer Olympics and the 1988 Summer Olympics.

References

1957 births
Living people
Taiwanese male weightlifters
Olympic weightlifters of Taiwan
Weightlifters at the 1984 Summer Olympics
Weightlifters at the 1988 Summer Olympics
Place of birth missing (living people)
20th-century Taiwanese people